Mukah may refer to:
Mukah
Mukah (federal constituency), represented in the Dewan Rakyat